Theodosii Spassov (born 4 March 1961) is a Bulgarian jazz musician who plays kaval.
Theodosii Spassov began his early training on the kaval at the Kotel Music School and The Academy of Music and Dance in Plovdiv/Bulgaria. The kaval, an eight-hole wooden "shepherd" flute, is one of the oldest Instruments in Europe, rich in tone and technical possibilities. Theodosii Spassov has developed his own unique style of playing the instrument by synthesizing traditional folklore with jazz, fusion and classical music.

For over 20 years, Theodosii has toured all over Europe, Asia, the Middle East, Australia, Canada and United States. In 1994, he performed with Sofia Women's Radio Choir which was awarded with a Grammy award for "Le Mystere Des Voix Bulgares". In April 1995, "Newsweek" magazine recognized Theodosii Spassov as one of the most talented Eastern-European musicians in its "best of the East" article, noting that "Spassov... is not merely surviving the post-communist cultural wasteland. He has actually invented a new musical genre."

Theodosii Spassov has contributed to 20 CDs, four of his own, which have been noted worldwide. He has composed and performed numerous film scores including a French-Bulgarian feature film "Granitza", ("The Border") 1993. Also he recorded themes for films by Italian composers Carlos Siliotto and Ennio Morricone, entitled "An Italian Story" and "The Breakout of the Innocent". At the fourth European Jazz Night, Theodosii Spassov was a featured performer along with other jazz musicians, including Winton Marsalis.

At home in Bulgaria, Theodosii Spassov is national figure and musical hero, and was recently honored with the "Music Artist of the Year" award. He is the Artistic Director of the world-renowned "PHILIP KOUTEV Ensemble Of Music, Drama And Dance".

Theodosii is currently member of the company of the Irish music and dance "Riverdance"-(1998-2001). Now he is a soloist of Bulgarian National Radio.

Musical training
The Music School in Kotel and
The Academy of Music and Dance in Plovdiv.

Awards
The Special Prize of Detroit Flute Festival 1994
The International Academy of Arts in Paris Award 1996
“Music Artist of the Year” at the National Music Awards 1997 and 2002
Apollo Toxophoros for sparkling contribution to Bulgarian music 2001
National Film Centre Annual Awards-”Best film music composer” 2006
“Artist Of Salon Des Arts”  2007
“Dobri Chintulov” for culture activity 2009
“Golden Age” for contribution to Bulgarian culture 2011
"Artist for Peace" named by UNESCO  in commitment to highlight music as a force to enhance dialogue among people, cultures and communities. 2015

Artists he worked with
Jazz Linia, “Le Mystere des Voix Bulgares”, Trio “Bulgarka”, National Radio Sofia Orchestras, Ivo Papazov, Yldiz Ibrahimova, Vesselin Nikolov, Milcho Leviev and Katoomi (Karen Briggs,Nedra Wheeler, Tootie Heath) Acoustic Version, Dave Liebman, Dimitrios Vassilakis, Andy Sheppard, Jamey Haddad, Albert Mangelsdorf, Mark Johnson, Trilok Gurtu, Kazumi Watanabe, Glen Velez, Rabih Abou-Khalil, Matt Darriau, Boyan Zulfikarpasic, Dionisis Savopulos, Paul McCandless, Glen Moore, Billy Cobham, The Shin, Ennio Morricone, Vlatko Stefanovski, Miroslav Tadić

Concerts as a soloist in
Spassov has done concerts in the following countries as a soloist; Argentina, Australia, Austria, Brazil, Canada, Finland, Germany, Greece, Holland, India, Israel, Japan, Nepal, 
Russia, Spain, Switzerland, Turkey, the U.K. and the U.S..

External links
 Theodosii Spassov's page
 UNESCO home page

Bulgarian jazz musicians
People from Isperih
Living people
1961 births
Bulgarian flautists